The 2015–16 Loyola Greyhounds men's basketball team represented Loyola University Maryland during the 2015–16 NCAA Division I men's basketball season. The Greyhounds, led by third year head coach G.G. Smith, played their home games at Reitz Arena and were members of the Patriot League. They finished the season 9–21, 8–10 in Patriot League play to finish in eighth place. They lost in the first round of the Patriot League tournament to Holy Cross.

Previous season
The Greyhounds finished the season 11–19, 7–11 in Patriot League play to finish in ninth place. They lost in the first round of the Patriot League tournament to Holy Cross.

Departures

Incoming recruits

2016 class recruits

Roster

Schedule

|-
!colspan=9 style="background:#00563F; color:#DBD9D1;"| Exhibition

|-
!colspan=9 style="background:#00563F; color:#DBD9D1;"| Non-conference regular season

|-
!colspan=9 style="background:#00563F; color:#DBD9D1;"| Patriot League regular season

|-
!colspan=9 style="background:#00563F; color:#DBD9D1;"| Patriot League tournament

References

Loyola Greyhounds men's basketball seasons
Loyola